The Cathedral Basilica of Our Lady of Succour or more commonly the Cathedral of Valencia, is a cathedral of the Roman Catholic Church in Valencia, Venezuela. It is a National Historic Landmark, situated in the center of the city opposite the Plaza Bolivar. 

Pope Pius X granted a decree of coronation towards the image on 13 November 1910, a dolorous image of the Blessed Virgin Mary titled “The Virgin of Succour”. Pope John XXIII issued a decree Urbi Valentinæ which praised the piety of the peoples, celebrating its fiftieth anniversary of coronation and raised the shrine to the status of Minor Basilica on 10 February 1960.

History

The building was originally constructed as the local parish church.during the colonial period circa 1580, about 25 years after the city of Valencia was founded.

Nuestra Señora del Socorro became a cathedral in 1921 upon the erection of the Diocese of the city of Valencia. It became the seat of the bishops of the diocese, beginning with Monsignor Granadillo. Monsignor Gregorio Adam led the diocese from 1947—1971.  

The cathedral is notable for its architecture and for its status as the final resting place of the image of the Virgin of Succour (Virgin of Help), a notable Marian image that was granted a Pontifical decree of  canonical coronation by Pope Pius X on 13 November 1910. 

Pope John XXIII issued a decree Urbi Valentinæ which praised the piety of the peoples, celebrating its fiftieth anniversary of coronation and raised the shrine to the status of Minor Basilica on 10 February 1960. Ultimately, the diocese of Valencia was elevated to the rank of archdiocese in 1974.

Modifications and Restorations 
The building was modified in 1710, 1818—1820, 1830, and again in 1942. The 19th century architectural modifications gave the building its present neoclassical style.

The church once again underwent a thorough restoration from 2013—2016, carried out by the architect Sara de Atienzar and restorer Fernando de Tovar.

See also
Roman Catholicism in Venezuela
Caracas Cathedral

References

Roman Catholic cathedrals in Venezuela
Buildings and structures in Valencia, Venezuela
Roman Catholic churches completed in 1580
Basilica churches in Venezuela
Spanish Colonial architecture in Venezuela
16th-century Roman Catholic church buildings in Venezuela